Monsignor Ciaran O'Carroll is an Irish Catholic priest who serves as Episcopal Vicar for Priests of the Archdiocese of Dublin and was formerly Rector of the Pontifical Irish College in Rome.

From Mount Merrion in Dublin, Fr. O'Carroll studied for the priesthood in Clonliffe College and also at University College Dublin before further studies in Rome, graduating from the Angelicum University, Rome, and the Gregorian University, Rome. O'Carroll holds a Doctorate in Church History.  He has lectured in Clonliffe College and also at Maynooth College.

As a priest in the Dublin Diocese, O’Carroll served as parish priest of Saggart, Rathcoole, and Brittas.  He worked in Clonliffe for the Archbishop of Dublin as the Episcopal Vicar for Evangelisation, and also served as the Administrator of the Catholic University Church on St Stephen's Green, Dublin.

O'Carroll was appointed Rector of the Irish College in 2011 and Episcopal Vicar for Priests of the Archdiocese of Dublin in 2020.

O'Carroll is a first-cousin of the late broadcaster Marian Finucane and presided over her funeral mass in January 2020

Publications
 Ciaran O'Carroll, Paul Cardinal Cullen: Portrait of a Practical Nationalist, Veritas Books, 2009.

References

21st-century Irish Roman Catholic priests
People from Mount Merrion
People from County Dublin
Alumni of University College Dublin
Alumni of Clonliffe College
Pontifical Gregorian University alumni
Pontifical University of Saint Thomas Aquinas alumni